Zarechny is a rural locality (a settlement) in Sevsky District, Bryansk Oblast, Russia. The population was 440 as of 2010. There are 5 streets.

Geography 
Zarechny is located 5 km north of Sevsk (the district's administrative centre) by road. Penkozavod is the nearest rural locality.

References 

Rural localities in Sevsky District